Deili Custodio da Silva (born March 8, 1980) is a former Brazilian football player.

Playing career
In 2001, Deili joined Japanese J2 League club Ventforet Kofu which finished at the bottom place for 2 years in a row (1999-2000). He debuted in J2 against Shonan Bellmare on March 17. He played many matches as forward after the debut. However he could hardly play in the match from July and left Ventforet in August.

Club statistics

References

External links

1980 births
Living people
Brazilian footballers
Brazilian expatriate footballers
Expatriate footballers in Japan
J2 League players
Ventforet Kofu players
Association football forwards